Deathmate was a six-part comic book crossover between Valiant Comics and Image Comics published in 1993 and 1994.

Background
Designated by color rather than issue numbers (namely Yellow, Blue, Black, and Red) plus two book-end issues, Deathmate Prologue and Deathmate Epilogue, as well as Preview issues collected with comic products, the four main issues were written so they could be read in any order. Created at the peak of the comic book speculator boom, the project was heavily promoted and sold hundreds of thousands of copies, but was beset with production delays. The Image half (Black, Red, and Epilogue) came out severely behind schedule and out of sequence. Deathmate Red shipped after the epilogue issue, and despite cover dates of September 1993 to February 1994, the actual publication lag was far longer than six months.

The plot evolved around a chance interdimensional meeting of two characters, Solar from Valiant and Void from Image's WildC.A.T.s. The two became lovers, but their joining would mean the destruction of both comic book universes.

It is notable that only half of the Image founding members chose to take part. Erik Larsen, Jim Valentino, and Todd McFarlane were not involved, although McFarlane's character Al Simmons makes a brief appearance in Deathmate Red.

Synopsis 
In a world that had been long since become a terrible place, Solar reluctantly granted the wish of his lifelong companion, Gayle Nordheim to dissipate the lifegiving energy that had kept her alive and young for so long. So unable to contain his grief by her passing, Solar was literally split in two. The remaining Solar vanished into a life of seclusion while the new persona went off to find other planes of reality to explore.

There, in a dimension between what is real and unreal, he encountered a creature of incredible power, a woman from a distant universe, Void. The two fell in love, a love that wound end all time literally. Upon consummating, their combined energies fused, unwarping the fabric of time, spiraling backwards and eating away at their distinct timelines. In an instant, things were not as they should be: heroes fought alongside those who had been their enemies in a different world; great men who would bring justice to the world died horrible, untimely deaths. Only men with the gift of foresight, Geoff McHenry and Prophet, knew that all was not as it should be. Where they had seen a future so clearly before, there was now nothing.

Geoff and Prophet are resolved to gather the heroes of this amalgamated universe together to fight the battle to save all time.

The books 
Preview Issues
Green
sold with Comic Defense comic bags or Advance Comics magazine
Same story and cover, but with the logo of the sponsor in the corner
Story: Solar and Prophet battle Erica Pierce

Orange and Pink
sold with Previews magazine
Same story, but different covers
Story: Archer chases Shadowman while Grifter chases Archer

Books from Valiant

 Deathmate Prologue
"A Love to End All Time"
Story: Bob Layton
Pencils: Barry Windsor-Smith
Inks: Jim Lee

"Universal Truth"
Story: Bob Layton
Pencils: Rob Liefeld
Inks: Bob Layton with Danny Miki and Dan Panosian

 Deathmate Yellow
"Jerked Through Time" (featuring characters from Archer & Armstrong and WildC.A.T.s)
Story: Mike Baron
Pencils: Bernard Chang
Inks: Rodney Ramos

"Cat and Mouse" (featuring characters from Ninjak and WildC.A.T.s)
Story: Jorge Gonzalez.
Pencils: Don Perlin
Inks: Mike Manley

"The Dying Game" (featuring characters from H.A.R.D. Corps and WildC.A.T.s)
Story: David Michelinie and Bob Layton
Pencils: Mike Leeke
Inks: Tom Ryder

"Revelations and Recruitments" (featuring characters from Shadowman and WildC.A.T.s)
Story: Bob Hall
Pencils: Mark Moretti
Inks: John Dixon

 Deathmate Blue
"Battlestone vs. Magnus Outlaw!" (featuring characters from Brigade and Magnus: Robot Fighter)
Story: John Ostrander
Pencils: Jim Calafiore
Inks: Ralph Reese

"Secret Forces" (featuring characters from Secret Weapons and Cyberforce)
Story: Joe St. Pierre
Pencils: Sean Chen
Inks: Kathryn Bolinger

"Sacrifices" (featuring characters from Harbinger, Brigade, and Cyberforce)
Story: Maurice Fontenot
Pencils: Howard Simpson
Inker: Gonzalo Mayo

"Supremely Darque" (featuring characters from Solar and Supreme)
Story: Kevin VanHook
Pencils: Peter Grau
Inker: Jimmy Palmiotti

Books from Image
 Deathmate Black (featuring characters from Gen¹³, WildC.A.T.s, Turok: Dinosaur Hunter, Cyberforce, and X-O Manowar)
Story: Brandon Choi and Eric Silvestri
Pencils: Brandon Peterson, Brett Booth, Marc Silvestri, J. Scott Campbell (as Jeffrey Scott),Scott Clark, Greg Capullo, Jim Lee, and Whilce Portacio
Inks: Scott Williams, Sal Regla, Alex Garner, and Trevor Scott

 Deathmate Red (featuring characters from Youngblood, Bloodshot and Eternal Warrior)
Story and Pencils: Rob Liefeld
Script: Eric Stephenson
Additional pencils: Jeff Matsuda, Rich Horie, Dan Fraga, Cedric Nocon, Dan Pacella, Anthony Winn, Marat Mychaels
Inks: Danny Miki, Jon Sibal, Marlo Alquiza

 Deathmate Epilogue
Story: Bob Layton
Pencils: Marc Silvestri and Joe Quesada
Inks: Bob Layton and Scott Williams

Aftermath 
Although the issues of Deathmate produced by Valiant shipped on schedule, those produced by Image Comics did not, a problem that Image faced with many of its publications in its early years. The books were pre-ordered in heavy quantities by retailers, and when shipping dates were not met, distributors cancelled the original orders and required re-orders. By the time the last issues did arrive, some fans had lost interest, leaving retailers with unsold copies.

As a cross-promotion, two trading card companies also did a cross-over, Upper Deck and Topps. Upper Deck produced the Valiant cards featuring only characters and art from their corresponding titles.  The Topps set would be based on the Deathmate Red and Black issues and would include artwork from Rob Liefeld and Jim Lee.  This set was to be 90 cards in total and would feature two types of chase cards:  A prismatic laminate covering called "Deathmatrix" and a chromium covering entitled "Deathchrome".  However, because of the deadline problems with Image Comics, Topps ended up backing out of the contract. Upper Deck’s Valiant Deathmate cards did not fare well on the market.

In a retrospective interview on the rise and fall of Valiant, Bob Layton (former editor in chief) lambasted the whole affair, regarding it as an "unmitigated disaster." Layton says he had to fly to Los Angeles and literally sit on Liefeld's doorstep until Liefeld finished his penciled art for the Deathmate Prologue, and then  Layton inked the artwork himself in an Anaheim hotel room. Layton stated, "What a pain in the ass that was! There I was, with my own company to manage, and I was in California, managing someone else's people. I look back at it and can't believe some of the shit I had to put up with as E.I.C. of Valiant. As far as failures, Deathmate and [Valiant promotion] Birthquake were unmitigated disasters. Not necessarily in the numbers, but in the consequences of their release...I think that Deathmate sounded the beginning of the problems, and when Image couldn't get their side of the cross-over out on time, it hurt everyone. I think [Valiant crossover] Chaos Effect the next summer was a decent idea, but there wasn't anything new to capture the audience's imagination. We made a specific mistake in choosing not to advertise during the summer of '93. Our books were almost too hot and we wanted to get more realistic numbers. Remember, we were the collectible company. That meant wealthier speculators buying cases of the stuff, hoping to sell it for ten times what they paid for it within a year. In some cases, they did! That's why there's so much of our output from that era on the market."

"I literally had nothing to do with most of those projects," Layton revealed, "Deathmate was thrust upon us because (Steve) Massarsky and Jim Lee were best buddies at the time and had privately arranged the crossover."

For retailers, Deathmate was harmful, due to the tying up of cash flow with books arriving late, especially given the $4.95 USD cover price (at the time, the average comic book cover price was less than half of that). Also due to waning fan interest, the re-orders were lower than initial orders. The Valiant Deathmate books (Prologue, Blue, and Yellow) had print runs of over 700,000 copies, but by the time Deathmate Red was released, it had a print run of 250,000, although retailers were nonetheless left with many unsold copies. At the time, comic book distributors would only allow unsold books to be returned if they were six months late. Retailers dealt constantly with late books from Image, which indirectly caused some comic book shops to close. Partially due to the lateness of Image publications, the window was eventually decreased to two months.

Collected issues
As of now the issues of the crossover have yet to be collected. This is likely due to the (often confusing) truth of the involved characters being owned, licensed, and printed by a large number of separate publishers. The respective owners and publishers consist of Gold Key Comics, Image Comics, Valiant Comics, Wildstorm Comics, DC Comics, Dynamite Comics, and Dark Horse Comics.

References

External links 
Marcotte, John (May 14, 2005). "The Comic-Book Apocalypse". Badmouth.

1993 comics debuts
Comics by David Michelinie
Comics by Jim Lee
Comics by John Ostrander
Image Comics limited series
Intercompany crossovers
Valiant Comics titles
Top Cow titles
WildStorm limited series